The CBU-75 Sadeye was a United States cluster bomb used during the Vietnam War. It could hold 1,800  BLU-26 anti-personnel bomblets, each containing  of explosives with impact or time delay fuzes that would produce around 600 fragments.

References

Cluster munition
Cold War aerial bombs of the United States